The Chicago Jamaco Saints was a basketball team. They were a part of the National Alliance of Basketball Leagues.

History
The Saints competed at the 1966 edition of the Intercontinental Cup.

References

Jamaco Saints